Carpenter Township may refer to the following townships in the United States:

 Carpenter Township, Jasper County, Indiana
 Carpenter Township, Itasca County, Minnesota